Drilaster axillaris is a species of firefly in the subfamily Ototretinae.

Description
The luciferase of Drilaster axillaras has been cloned and recombinantly expressed, and has an luminescent emission maximum of 545 nm.

Range
Drilaster axillaris is found in Japan.

References

Lampyridae
Insects of Japan
Beetles described in 1879